Bäumler or Baeumler  [ˈbɔʏmlɐ] (Americanized as Baumler) is a German surname. Notable people with the surname include:

 Albert Baumler (1914–1973), American fighter ace
 Alfred Baeumler (1887–1968), German philosopher
 Andreas J. Bäumler, German-born professor for microbiology and immunology at the University of California Davis
 Erich Bäumler (1930–2003), German footballer
 Hans-Jürgen Bäumler (born 1942), German figure skater, actor, pop singer and television host

For the fictional character with similar sounding surname, see: Brad Boimler.

See also
 Baumer
 Bäumer

German-language surnames
Occupational surnames